George Herbert Carpenter (1865–1939) was a British naturalist and entomologist, born in the Peckham district of southeast London in 1865, and died in Belfast on 22 January 1939. His main interests were in the study of insects and arachnids, zoogeography, and economic zoology. In addition to numerous contributions to scientific journals and Encyclopædia Britannica, he authored five books.

Education and career
Carpenter was privately educated as a youth, and studied at King's College London, earning a Bachelor of Science degree at London University and a Doctor of Science degree from Queen's University Belfast.

His first employment as a naturalist was as a clerk in the South Kensington Museum, where he pursued an interest in the natural history of Ireland. In 1888, he took a position in Dublin, Ireland as Assistant Naturalist at the Museum of Science and Art, Dublin, devoting the next 16 years to developing the museum's collections on the natural history of Ireland.

He was active in the Dublin Naturalists' Field Club and in 1892 he co-founded the Irish Naturalists' Journal, for which he was editor until his retirement in 1922.

Publications
Carpenter contributed to a range of scientific journals and to Encyclopædia Britannica, and wrote five books:
 Insects: Their Structure & Life, A Primer of Entomology. London: J. M. Dent, 1899.
 Catalogue of the Fishes of New York (with Tarleton Hoffman Bean). New York State Museum Bulletin No. 60; Zoology, No. 9. Albany: University of the State of New York, 1903.
 The Life-story of Insects. Cambridge: University press, and G. P. Putnam's Sons, 1913.
 Insect Transformation. London: Methuen, 1921.
 The Biology of Insects. New York: The Macmillan Company, 1928.

Personal
Carpenter was a son of George and Phoebe (née Hooper) Carpenter. In 1891, he married Emma Eason of Dublin, with whom he had two sons.

See also
 :Category:Taxa named by George Herbert Carpenter

References

External links

 
 
 

1865 births
1939 deaths
Entomologists from London
People from Peckham
Alumni of Queen's University Belfast
Alumni of King's College London